Alexander von Bischoffshausen (26 October 1846 in Hanau - 18 June 1928 in Brannenburg) was the director of the Reichsschuldenverwaltung (Reich Debt Commission) from 1907 to 1918.

References

External links 

1846 births
1928 deaths
German male painters
20th-century German painters
20th-century German male artists
20th-century German civil servants
19th-century German painters
19th-century German male artists